As We See It is an American comedy-drama streaming television series created by Jason Katims, based on the Israeli series On the Spectrum by Dana Idisis and Yuval Shafferman. The 8-episode series premiered on Amazon Prime Video on January 21, 2022. It was canceled after one season.

Synopsis
The series follows roommates Jack, Harrison and Violet, all in their 20s,  all of whom are on the autism spectrum, as they look for work, make friends, and fall in love.

Cast
 Rick Glassman as Jack Hoffman
 Albert Rutecki as Harrison Dietrich
 Sue Ann Pien as Violet Wu
 Sosie Bacon as Mandy, aide for Jack, Harrison, and Violet
 Chris Pang as Van Wu, Violet’s brother
 Joe Mantegna as Lou Hoffman, Jack's father
 Vella Lovell as Salena, Van's girlfriend
 Tal Anderson as Gia
 Alyssa Jirrels as Nicole Dietrich, Harrison's sister
 Casey Mills as Julian
 David Futernick as John 
 Délé Ogundiran as Ewatomi Kokomo 
 Andrew Duff as Douglas

Episodes

Production

Development
On March 14, 2019, it was revealed that Amazon Prime Video was set to distribute the American TV series adaptation of On the Spectrum, with Jason Katims writing and executive producing. True Jack Productions' Jeni Mulein and Yes Studios’ Dana Stern also executive produced. On October 11, 2021, the title was revealed to be As We See It. Jesse Peretz directed and executive produced the pilot episode. On October 20, 2022, Amazon Prime Video canceled the series after one season.

Casting
On June 12, 2019, Rick Glassman, Sue Ann Pien, Albert Rutecki, Sosie Bacon and Chris Pang were cast in the series. Glassman, Pien, and Rutecki, like their characters, are all autistic. On October 11, 2021, Joe Mantegna was announced as a cast member.

Release
On October 11, 2021, the first look photos for the series were released. On November 22, 2021, the official trailer was released. All eight episodes of the series premiered on Prime Video on January 21, 2022.

Reception 
The review aggregator website Rotten Tomatoes reported a 92% approval rating with an average rating of 8/10, based on 25 critic reviews. The website's critics consensus reads, "As We See It deftly sidesteps schmaltz by depicting people on the spectrum as well-rounded individuals with their own foibles, enriching both the comedy and pathos." Metacritic, which uses a weighted average, assigned a score of 82 out of 100 based on 17 critics, indicating "universal acclaim".

Daniel Feinberg wrote for The Hollywood Reporter that it is "a heartfelt mixture of mostly earned tears and laughter."

References

External links
 
 
 
 Official pilot screenplay

2020s American comedy television series
2020s American drama television series
Amazon Prime Video original programming
2022 American television series debuts
2022 American television series endings
American television series based on Israeli television series
English-language television shows
Autism in television
Television series by Amazon Studios
Television series by Universal Television
Television shows set in Los Angeles